The Mosselprom building (Russian: Дом Моссельпрома) is a monument to Russian constructivism and avantgarde architecture. It is located in the centre of Moscow on an intersection between Kalashny, Nizhny Kislovksy and Maly Kislovky side streets. It was designed by architect N. D. Strukov and is notable for its painted panels by the artists Alexander Rodchenko and his wife Varvara Stepanova.

The building was originally intended as a seven-story apartment house with restaurant, built in 1912-13 by Strukov; however, it was hastily constructed and collapsed on March 22, 1913. A part of the structure was rebuilt by 1917; in 1923-1925 two more floors were added for storage and offices for Mosselprom, the Moscow Rural Cooperative Administration, which combined flour, confectionery, and chocolate factories, breweries, and tobacco companies.

In the 1930s it reverted to an apartment building; the linguist Viktor Vinogradov lived there from 1964 to 1969.  It was restored in 1997, and it currently houses a branch of the Russian Academy of Theatre Arts.

References 

Buildings and structures in Moscow
Russian avant-garde
Constructivist architecture
Cultural heritage monuments of regional significance in Moscow